Miłosz Stępiński (born 1 August 1974) is a Polish football manager, currently in charge of the Polish under-20 national team.

Between 2016 and 2021, he was the head coach of Poland's women national team. On 23 March 2021, he was announced as the head coach of the Poland under-20 national team.

He has a UEFA Pro license.

Honours

Poland women's 
 Algarve Cup: 2019 runners-up

References

1984 births
Living people
People from Szczecin
Polish football managers
Women's national association football team managers